Wiśniówka may refer to the following:

Places 

Wiśniówka, Kuyavian-Pomeranian Voivodeship (north-central Poland)
Wiśniówka, Lublin Voivodeship (east Poland)
Wiśniówka, Świętokrzyskie Voivodeship (south-central Poland)
Wiśniówka, Pomeranian Voivodeship (north Poland)

Other 

 Wisniowka (liqueur) - a beverage made from cherries; aka wiśniówka